Guguan is an island in the Northern Mariana Islands in the Pacific Ocean. The island is currently uninhabited.

History
Guguan was discovered in 1668 by the Spanish missionary Diego Luis de Sanvitores who charted it as San Felipe. It is likely that it was previously visited in 1522 by the Spanish sailor Gonzalo de Vigo, deserter from the Magellan expedition in 1521, who was the first European castaway in the history of the Pacific. Uninhabited at the time, in contrast to other islands in the Marianas it was never colonized. As with the other islands in the northern Marianna, Guguan was sold by Spain to the German Empire in 1899, and administered as part of German New Guinea. From 1909 to 1912, the island was leased to a Japanese company, who sent hunters to gather bird feathers for the European hat industry.

During World War I, Guguan came under the control of the Empire of Japan and was subsequently administered as the South Seas Mandate. Following World War II, the island came under the control of the United States and was administered as part of the Trust Territory of the Pacific Islands. Since 1978, the island has been part of the Northern Islands Municipality of the Commonwealth of the Northern Mariana Islands.

Geography

. The only recorded eruption was around in 1883, from the northern peak, which produced pyroclastic flows as well as lava flows which reached the coast. The coast is bordered by steep basaltic rock with gables of high ridges which contain deep, rain-eroded gorges.

Environment
In the early 1980s, Guguan was set aside as a nature preserve by the Commonwealth of the Northern Mariana Islands (CNMI). It has never been permanently settled by humans and is free from feral species such as feral camels, cats, chickens, dogs, donkeys, goats, horses, mice, pigeons, pigs, rabbits, rats. Among the undisturbed wildlife is the rare Micronesian megapode Megapodius laperouse which can be found only in the Northern Marianas and the Palau Islands. The island has been recognised as an Important Bird Area (IBA) by BirdLife International because it supports populations of Micronesian megapodes, white-throated ground doves, sooty terns, grey-backed terns, Micronesian myzomelas and Micronesian starlings.

References

 Russell E. Brainard et al.: Coral reef ecosystem monitoring report of the Mariana Archipelago: 2003–2007. (=PIFSC Special Publication, SP-12-01) NOAA Fisheries, Pacific Islands Fisheries Science Center 2012

External links 

 
 Pascal Horst Lehne and Christoph Gäbler: Über die Marianen. Lehne-Verlag, Wohldorf in Germany 1972. and Guguan
Guguan

Former German colonies
Islands of the Northern Mariana Islands
Active volcanoes
Volcanoes of the Northern Mariana Islands
Stratovolcanoes of the United States
Calderas of Oceania
Uninhabited islands of the Northern Mariana Islands
Important Bird Areas of the Northern Mariana Islands
Seabird colonies